The 2014 FIBA Europe Under-18 Championship Division B was an international basketball  competition held in Bulgaria in 2014.

Final ranking

Awards

External links
FIBA Archive

FIBA U18 European Championship Division B
2014–15 in European basketball
2014–15 in Bulgarian basketball
International youth basketball competitions hosted by Bulgaria